Pearl of the Philippines may refer to:

 Pearl of Lao Tzu, the largest known pearl in the world; found in the Palawan sea
 Mutya ng Pilipinas, a beauty pageant held annually in the Philippines

Places
Boracay, a small island in the Philippines
Puerto Galera
Tawi-Tawi, sometimes called the "southernmost pearl of the Philippines".